Iultinsky District (Chukchi: , Ivyltin rajon) is an administrative and municipal district (raion), one of the six in Chukotka Autonomous Okrug, Russia. It is located in the northeast of the autonomous okrug and borders with the Chukchi Sea in the north, Providensky District in the east, Gulf of Anadyr in the southeast, and with Anadyrsky District in the southwest. Its administrative center is the urban locality (an urban-type settlement) of Egvekinot. Population:  The population of Egvekinot accounts for 64.4% of the district's total population.

The territory of the modern district has been populated since the Paleolithic age, though indigenous people are outnumbered by ethnic Russians by over three to one. The district was once a major center for mining tin and tungsten at Iultin, with the infrastructure built by gulag prisoners, but these mines have proved uneconomical in recent years and closed with their associated settlements abandoned.

Geography

Iultinsky District covers the northeastern part of the Chukchi Peninsula, except for its easternmost part, and touches two oceans. In the north, the district borders the Chukchi Sea, a bleak environment that is ice-bound for nine months of the year and where storms can produce waves several meters high lashing the coast. To the south is the administrative center and small port of Egvekinot, located on the Kresta Bay. To the south of the Kresta Bay it reaches almost to the Anadyrsky Liman.

The central part of the district is quite mountainous. The northwest is drained by the Amguema River. This valley is a key resource for the part of the population that does not live by the sea and contains the only significant stretch of road in the district, running from Egvekinot, through the indigenous locality of Amguema, to the now defunct mining settlement of Iultin near the Arctic. Other populated places in the district are only reachable either by sea or by helicopter.

History

Prehistory
It is thought that the area of what is now Iultinsky District was where the first people settled in Chukotka during the Paleolithic Age. Archaeological excavations have uncovered stone age camps and tools along the banks of both the Kymynanonvyaam and Maravaam Rivers.

A greater number of camps has been unearthed dating from the Neolithic Period along almost all the significant rivers in the district. Further excavations around Vankarem, Nutepelmen, and Uelkal indicate that there was a change in hunting practices during the 3rd millennium BCE as the native people began not only to follow migrating animals in the tundra, but also to hunt animals at sea. The locations of the archeological discoveries have established that the sea-fishing communities have been in existence in their current locations for a considerable period of time.

17th–18th centuries

After Semyon Dezhnyov and his Cossack companions had established Anadyrsk in the 17th century, they began to explore the surrounding area and discovered the Kresta Bay in 1660, although it was not mapped properly until it was visited by Vitus Bering seventy years later.

20th century
The district was founded on December 2, 1953. The economy on this territory received a major boost following the discovery in the 1930s of significant deposits of tin and tungsten in Mount Iultin. This discovery resulted in the creation of the settlement of Iultin. Initially the settlement was kept supplied by a convoy of tractors, but it was difficult to make significant progress and so to ensure the settlement could continue to be supplied, a road was built linking Egvekinot, Amguema, and Iultin.

During World War II, the territory played an important role in the Soviet supply chain, providing the eastern end of the Uelkal-Krasnoyarsk air route, used by Russia for the delivery of the Lend-Lease planes provide by the United States.

Following the end of World War II, Dalstroy used forced labor to build a port to help supply the mine, and in 1946, the MV Sovetskaya Latviya, one of a fleet of ships used by Dalstroy to transport prisoners to the Kolyma gulag, landed in the Kresta Bay to begin construction. Extreme conditions meant that, as in the construction of the Road of Bones, many prisoners died working and were buried where they fell and incorporated into the foundations of the port. Such bodies are still discovered during the spring thaw each year.

In order to provide the necessary power to the mines at Iultin, two power stations—one diesel, one steam-powered—were constructed in Ozyorny (now a microdistrict of Egvekinot); however, in recent years, mining in the region has proved impractical and the mines at Iultin were closed and the settlement abandoned, with the population moving to Egvekinot.

Mergers

Before May 2008, Iultinsky Administrative District was municipally incorporated as Iultinsky Municipal District. In May 2008, Iultinsky and Shmidtovsky Municipal Districts were merged, forming an enlarged Vostochny Municipal District. This change, however, did not affect the administrative aspect of these districts. Both Iultinsky and Shmidtovsky Administrative Districts continued to exist separately.

In October 2008, the law mandating the change was amended and the name Vostochny was discarded with the combined municipal district being renamed Iultinsky Municipal District. Shmidtovsky Administrative District was merged into Iultinsky Administrative District effective June 13, 2011.

Demographics
The population consists mainly of Russians, although Chukchi, the dominant native people in the district and other indigenous peoples such as Yupik make up about 24% of the total population. The district is bisected by both the Arctic Circle and the line of the 180° longitude.

Economy

The main center of economic activity is around Egvekinot and its Ozyorny Microdistrict, a former rural locality now abolished and merged with Egvekinot. This settlement contains the main sea port, a hydroelectric power plant, and the district's principal airport, with Chukotavia providing air service to all major airports within the autonomous okrug.

Outside of the main urban area of Egvekinot, the economy is driven mainly by either mineral extraction (the area is rich in pewter and wolframite as well as coal), traditional indigenous reindeer herding or sea-based hunting, with Chukchi farming centers such as Amguema, Vankarem, and Konergino holding nearly 25,000 head of reindeer in 2005. One of the settlements where marine hunting is the main economic driver, Uelkal, is the most westerly Eskimo settlement in the world.

Transportation
In addition to the airports, Iultinsky District also contains the longest road in Chukotka, which goes from Egvekinot to Iultin through indigenous settlements such as Amguema. There are also a number of winter and tractor roads which branch off from the main Iultinskaya Road serving settlements such as Svetly and Vostochny, as well as some of the geological and mining camps in the district.

Administrative and municipal status

Within the framework of administrative divisions, Iultinsky District is one of the six in the autonomous okrug. The urban-type settlement of Egvekinot serves as its administrative center. The district does not have any lower-level administrative divisions and has administrative jurisdiction over three urban-type settlements and eight rural localities, consisting of all seven of the inhabited localities listed below in the "Inhabited localities" section and the rural locality of Billings.

As a municipal division, the district is incorporated as Iultinsky Municipal District and is divided into two urban settlements and five rural settlements. The rural locality of Billings, which is administratively a part of Iultinsky District, is, however, municipally a part of Chaunsky Municipal District.

Inhabited localities

Divisional source:

*Administrative centers are shown in bold

References

Notes

Sources

External links
Official website of Iultinsky District  
Short film in abandoned mining settlement of Iultin
Short film on the transport difficulties faced in Iultinsky District

Districts of Chukotka Autonomous Okrug